Chryseobacterium humi is a bacterium. It is rod-shaped, non-motile, aerobic, catalase- and oxidase-positive and forms yellow colonies. Its type strain is ECP37(T) (=LMG 24684(T) =NBRC 104927(T)) .

References

Further reading

Whitman, William B., et al., eds. Bergey's manual® of systematic bacteriology. Vol. 5. Springer, 2012.
Van Wyk, Esias Renier. Virulence Factors and Other Clinically Relevant Characteristics of Chryseobacterium Species. Diss. University of the Freee State, 2008.

External links 
LPSN

Type strain of Chryseobacterium humi at BacDive -  the Bacterial Diversity Metadatabase

humi
Bacteria described in 2010